KBRX (1350 AM) is a radio station broadcasting a classic hits format licensed to O'Neill, Nebraska, United States. The station is currently owned by Ranchland Broadcasting Co. and features programming from ABC Radio.

References

External links

BRX
Classic hits radio stations in the United States